Kunwar Bahadur Asthana (born 9 May, 1915) was an Indian politician and Chief Justice. He was a Member of Parliament, representing Uttar Pradesh in the Rajya Sabha the upper house of India's Parliament as a member of the Janata Party. He was Chief Justice of Allahabad High Court from 1974 to 1980.

References

Rajya Sabha members from Uttar Pradesh
Janata Party politicians
1915 births
Year of death missing
20th-century Indian judges
Judges of the Allahabad High Court
Chief Justices of the Allahabad High Court
People from Allahabad